Torreya grandis ((pinyin=Xiāngfěi) is a species of conifer in either the family Taxaceae, or Cephalotaxaceae. Originated in the Jurassic period, about 170 million years ago, it is known as a "living fossil". 榧/fěi in 香榧/xiāngfěi is the genus name, and 香/xiāng" means fragrant. T. grandis is endemic to eastern and south-eastern China; it is found in the coastal provinces Fujian, Zhejiang, and Jiangsu, as well as in Anhui, Guizhou, Hunan, and Jiangxi inland. Its natural habitat are mountains and open valleys, often by streams, between  ASL. One common name is Chinese nutmeg yew (although it is not related to nutmeg, nor the true yews belonging to the genus Taxus), which refers to its edible seeds that superficially resemble nutmeg and its yew-like foliage.T. grandis is a precious tree species with multiple values. According to the survey data, its economic life is more than a thousand years.

Torreya grandis cv. Merrillii is a cultivar with a history going back to Tang Dynasty. It is believed to originate from the mountains of NE Zhejiang.

Uses
The nuts are edible or can be pressed for oil, and have high nutritional value. In traditional Chinese medicine, T. grandis has the effects of "消除疳积/eliminating malnutrition", "润肺滑肠/moisturizing the lungs and smoothing the intestines", "化痰止咳/resolving phlegm and relieving cough", "治五痔，去三虫/treating five hemorrhoids, removing three intestinal parasites", "助筋骨/beneficial to muscles and bones" and so on. According to modern chemical and medical analysis, T. grandis does have a lot of benefits and curative effects on the human body, for example, it has obvious inhibitory effect on lymphoblastic leukemia, and also has the effects of regulating blood lipids, softening cardiovascular and cerebrovascular, and anti-oxidation. In addition, the paclitaxel in leaves, bark, and arils can be used to treat a number of types of cancer. 

The linalyl acetate extracted from arils is the raw material for refining essential oil.

The wood is used in construction and high-quality furniture or sculpture, as well as in the production of high-quality go boards. 

T. grandis is used as an ornamental tree in Europe and North America.

Ｈistory
Ｔhe first European to discover Torreya grandis was Robert Fortune, who was hiking in the mountains of northeast Zhejiang in search of seeds, particularly those of "golden pine-tree" (Larix kaempferi). Encountering first two young cultivated trees, he managed to get guided to a valley with mature trees and purchased the seeds. The seeds brought to England could be grown successfully there.

T. grandis was recorded in the first surviving Chinese dictionary Erya as early as the 2nd century BC. In addition to ancient agricultural and Chinese medicine books, such as Shennong Ben Cao Jing, Xinxiu bencao or Bencao Gangmu, we can find its description and cherish in ancient Chinese poetry. In the Song Dynasty, processed "椒盐香榧/salt and pepper Xiāngfěi", "糖球香榧/sugar-ball-Xiāngfěi", and "香榧酥/Xiāngfěi pastry" were listed as court tributes, and it was also a treasure on the dining table of senior Scholar-officials. T. grandis has been cultivated for more than 1,500 years, but it is only sporadically planted because of the low survival rate, slow growth rate and low fruiting rate. Modern research on T. grandis only began in the 20s of the 20th century. The industry started in the 1970s. After decades of research by forestry experts, the relevant problems have been gradually solved. T. grandis can be regarded as a new industry in the 21st century. It has changed from a traditional industry to a technological industry, and it is developing vigorously. Among the scholars who devoted themselves to T. grandis, Professor 吴家胜/Wu Jiasheng and Professor 戴文圣/Dai Wensheng were rated as "最「美」科技人员/The most "beautiful" scientific and technical personnel" by CCP Central Publicity Department.

References

Grandis
Trees of China
Endemic flora of China
Edible plants
Taxonomy articles created by Polbot